Agelasta catenatoides is a species of beetle in the family Cerambycidae. It was described by Yamasako and Ohbayashi in 2009. It is known from Laos.

References

catenatoides
Beetles described in 2009